Royal Naval Air Station Fearn or RNAS Fearn (HMS Owl) is a former Royal Navy Fleet Air Arm base located  southeast of Tain, Scottish Highlands and  northeast of Inverness, Scottish Highlands, Scotland. The Tower has now been converted to residential use. See Restoration Man George Clark.

Units
A number of units were here at some point:

Current use
The site is currently used as farmland. On the south-east edge, a new, separate, aerodrome has been created by the name of "Easter Airfield". The control tower is now a private residence owned. It was in a 2015 episode of Channel 4's The Restoration Man. A lot of the original buildings on the other side of the camp are derelict and only have trash from fly-tipping, crows and bugs in them.

See also
 List of air stations of the Royal Navy

References

Citations

Bibliography

External links
 HMS Owl official website

Royal Naval Air Stations in Scotland